Galactia is a genus of plants in the legume family (Fabaceae). It belongs to the subfamily Faboideae. They do not have an unambiguous common name, being commonly called  milk peas, beach peas or wild peas.

Selected species
 Galactia anomala Lundell 
 Galactia martii DC. 
 Galactia megalophylla (F.Muell.) 
 Galactia mollis Michx.
 Galactia regularis (L.) Britton et al. (= G. volubilis)  
 Galactia smallii
 Galactia striata (Jacq.) Urb.
 Galactia striata var. villosa (Wight & Arn.) Verdc. (= G. tenuiflora var. villosa)
 Galactia tenuiflora (Willd.) Wight & Arn. 
 Galactia tenuiflora var. lucida

References

Phaseoleae
Fabaceae genera